Apicalia inflata is a species of sea snail, a marine gastropod mollusk in the family Eulimidae.

Distribution
This marine species is endemic to Australia and occurs off South Australia, Tasmania and Victoria

References

 Cotton, B.C. 1957. Records of uncommon southern Australian Mollusca. Records of the South Australian Museum (Adelaide) 13(1): 117-130

External links
 To World Register of Marine Species

Eulimidae
Gastropods described in 1901